Polná na Šumavě is a municipality and village in Český Krumlov District in the South Bohemian Region of the Czech Republic. It has about 200 inhabitants.

Administrative parts
Villages and hamlets of Květušín, Olšina and Otice are administrative parts of Polná na Šumavě.

History
The first written mention of Polná na Šumavě is from 1259. The municipality was recreated on 1 January 2016 by diminishing of Boletice Military Training Area.

References

External links

Villages in Český Krumlov District